Martina Hingis won in the final 6–4, 6–4 against Nathalie Tauziat.

Seeds
A champion seed is indicated in bold text while text in italics indicates the round in which that seed was eliminated. The top four seeds received a bye to the second round.

  Martina Hingis (champion)
  Mary Pierce (quarterfinals)
  Nathalie Tauziat (final)
  Arantxa Sánchez-Vicario (second round)
  Sandrine Testud (quarterfinals)
  Barbara Schett (second round)
  Tamarine Tanasugarn (semifinals)
  Henrieta Nagyová (second round)

Draw

Final

Top half

Bottom half

External links
 2001 Dubai Duty Free Women's Open draw

2001 Dubai Tennis Championships and Duty Free Women's Open
Singles